The men's individual skating event was held as part of the figure skating at the 1948 Winter Olympics. It was the seventh appearance of the event, which had previously been held twice at the Summer Olympics in 1908 and 1920 and at all four Winter Games from 1924 onward. The competition was held from 2 to 5 February 1948. Sixteen figure skaters from ten nations competed.

Results

Referee:
  Henri Mügeli

Assistant Referee:
  Eugen Kirchhofer

Judges:
  Kenneth M. Beaumont
  Emile Finsterwald
  M. Bernard Fox
  Vladimír Koudelka
  Ernst Labin
  Marcel Nicaise
  Melville F. Rogers
  Sven P. Sørensen
  Elemér Terták
  Bruno Bonfiglio (substitute)

References

Figure skating at the 1948 Winter Olympics
1948 in figure skating
Men's events at the 1948 Winter Olympics